Kleon Penn (born 1 September 1986) is a British Virgin Islander-Puerto Rican professional basketball player for the Brujos de Guayama of the Baloncesto Superior Nacional (BSN). He is currently the league’s all-time leader in blocks. He played college basketball for H. Lavity Stoutt Community College and McNeese State.

College career
Penn began his career with Tortola's H. Lavity Stoutt Community College where he averaged a double-double and eight blocked shots during the eight-game season while recording a triple-double in one game. 

The next season, he transferred to McNeese State where on his second year, he led the conference, ranked fourth in the nation and set a single season school record for blocked shots after ending with 117 for an average of 4.0 per game. By the end of his college career, he was second on the Cowboys' all-time career blocked shots list with 264 career blocked shots.

Professional career
After going undrafted in the 2009 NBA draft, Penn was drafted by the Caciques de Humacao with the second selection of Puerto Rico's 2010 draft and signed afterwards. After averaging 11 points, 8 rebounds and 3.5 blocks per game, he moved to Mexico and played with Soles de Mexicali and Potros ITSON before returning to Humacao where he won the first of three BSN Defensive Player of the Year awards.

On 24 August 2011, he returned to Mexico, this time with Fuerza Regia, however, he missed the rest of the 2011–2012 season after suffering a metatarsal fracture. On 31 March 2012, he returned to Humacao.

On 12 July 2012, he moved to Dominican Republic, this time with Huracanes del Atlántico for the rest of the year and on January 18, 2013, he signed with Venezuelan Toros de Aragua.

After a fourth stint with Humacao, Penn was traded on 21 January 2014 to Vaqueros de Bayamón.

After averaging 4.5 points, 5.5 rebounds and 2.0 blocks in 18.4 minutes per game with Vaqueros, Penn signed with the Minnesota Timberwolves on 18 September 2015. On 24 October 2015, he was waived by the Timberwolves after appearing in three preseason games. On 26 December, he returned to Venezuela, this time with Trotamundos de Carabobo. In February 2016, Penn was acquired by Brujos de Guayama.

As of October 2021, Penn is the BSN’s all-time leader in blocks.

Personal life
Penn was born in Fajardo, Puerto Rico from a British Virgin Islander mother that was visiting. Afterwards, they moved back to Tortola, British Virgin Islands where he grew up.

References

External links
 RealGM profile
 Latinbasket profile

1986 births
Living people
Baloncesto Superior Nacional players
British Virgin Islands men's basketball players
Caciques de Humacao players
Centers (basketball)
Correcaminos UAT Victoria players
Fuerza Regia de Monterrey players
Huracanes del Atlántico players
Junior college men's basketball players in the United States
McNeese Cowboys basketball players
People from Fajardo, Puerto Rico
People from Tortola
Potros ITSON de Obregón players
Soles de Mexicali players
Trotamundos B.B.C. players
Puerto Rican people of British Virgin Islands descent